Ọláwálé is both a surname and a given name of Yoruba origin meaning "a combination of prestige, success and wealth has arrived home". It may refer to:
Isiaka Olawale (born November 11, 1983), Nigerian footballer
Jamize Olawale (April 17, 1989), American football player
Olawale Adeniji Ige (born October 13, 1938), Nigerian engineer and politician
Olawale Adelusimi (born April 1, 1983), Nigerian footballer
Taslim Olawale Elias (11 November 1914 – 14 August 1991), Nigerian jurist

Yoruba-language surnames
Yoruba given names